The  was a combat aviation unit of the Imperial Japanese Navy Air Service (IJNAS) during the Pacific Campaign of World War II.

History
The 26th Air Flotilla was established on 1 April 1942 as a part of the 11th Air Fleet, and was originally composed of the Misawa Air Group and Kisarazu Air Group, both operating Mitsubishi G4M medium bombers. Under the command of Rear Admiral Seigo Yamagata, the unit was deployed to Rabaul on New Britain in August 1942 in order to reinforce the Japanese air power in the area and conduct operations in the New Guinea and Solomon Islands Campaigns. While being primarily a medium bomber unit, it eventually absorbed fighter (6th Air Group and Hiyō Air Group) and dive bomber (31st Air Group and 582nd Air Group) units too. The operational title for this hybrid organization was the 6th Air Attack Force. Due to vulnerability of G4M medium bombers, the unit took heavy losses in air combat over Guadalcanal.

Organization

Commanding officers

References
Footnotes

Citations

Bibliography

 
 

Units of the Imperial Japanese Navy Air Service
Military units and formations established in 1942